Lere is an extinct Kainji dialect cluster of Nigeria. The ethnic population was cited as 16,000 in 2000, of whom only a few speak the language. A wordlist from the Takaya dialect can be found under External links.

Dialects
Dialects are:

Si (Rishuwa, Kuzamani)
Gana
Takaya (Taura)

References

Further reading

External links
Lere profile at the Endangered Languages Project
Lere Takaya Wordlist

East Kainji languages
Languages of Nigeria
Extinct languages of Africa